A dinghy  is a type of small boat, often carried or towed by a larger vessel for use as a tender. Utility dinghies are usually rowboats or have an outboard motor.  Some are rigged for sailing but they differ from sailing dinghies, which are designed first and foremost for sailing.  A dinghy's main use is for transfers from larger boats, especially when the larger boat cannot dock at a suitably-sized port or marina.

The term "dinghy towing" sometimes is used to refer to the practice of towing a car or other smaller vehicle behind a motorhome, by analogy to towing a dinghy behind a yacht.

Etymology
The term is a loanword from the Bengali , Urdu , and Hindi .

Types 
Larger auxiliary vessels are generally called tenders, pinnaces or lifeboats. Folding and take-down multi-piece (nesting) dinghies are used where space is limited. Some newer dinghies have much greater buoyancy, giving them more carrying capacity than older boats of the same size.

Whaleboats are among the classic "pulling" (rowing) boats, with a sharp bow, fine stern lines and a canoe stern. Despite being somewhat more tippy, with less cargo capacity than prams, they row, motor and sail well because of their fine lines. Prior to the introduction of fibreglass as a construction material, dories were more popular because their ease of assembly and, thereby, lower cost.
Whitehall rowboats were the water taxis of the late 1800s until the invention of the small gasoline outboard. Considered one of the most refined rowboats for harbour and lake use, Whitehall rowboats are a descendant of the captain's gig which was used for a similar purpose on a naval vessel.
Dories are sharp-ended boats traditionally made of wood but now also produced in fibreglass or aluminium. They cut the water well, but their initial stability is low, making them feel tippy in flat water; a loaded dory becomes more stable as it is loaded. Dories are not generally used as service boats to yachts; they were used in large numbers in the cod fishing business, launched in numbers from the deck of a schooner hove to on the Grand Banks or other fishing ground. A dory can be landed or launched through surf where a Whitehall may founder. Dories are seldom called dinghies.
Prams are usually short with transoms at both bow and stern. They are difficult to tip and carry a lot of cargo or passengers for their length but are slower to row because of their short length and extreme rocker, although a skeg and/or bilge runners can make a difference, and even without they will row better than an inflatable. Popular as tenders on sail boats with limited deck space.
Some inflatable boats have a rigid deck and transom which allows an engine to be used for propulsion. They row poorly and do not tow well because of their blunt bows and large wetted surface area, but they are exceptionally buoyant.
Rigid safety dinghies are designed to row, motor, tow, and sail. In addition to their self-rescue lifeboat functionality, these boats serve as everyday tenders and as recreational boats. They are extremely buoyant and/or unsinkable and have great carrying capacity relative to length (see photo above).

Space issues

A dinghy is useful to avoid the need for expensive dock or slip space, so owners of small yachts compromise by carrying a small rigid dinghy or deflated inflatable, or by towing a larger dinghy. Space can be saved by storing items in containers or bags that are tied to the dinghy. Dinghies are sometimes used as lifeboats. Recently, self-rescue dinghies have returned to use as proactive lifeboats that can be sailed to safety.

Larger dinghies are towed and should have reserve buoyancy, an automatic bailer, and a cover to prevent them from being lost at sea. Most masters prefer a tow cable long enough to put the dinghy on the back side of the swell to prevent the dinghy from ramming the transom of the yacht.

Inflatables are inconvenient to tow and take extra time to inflate but are very compact and fit easily into place while at sea. Space can also be saved by using a sectional two-piece rigid dinghy that is towed while in harbour and disassembled into two nesting pieces while off-shore; typically the bow section fits inside the stern and is stored upside down on deck. There are several types of collapsible rigid dinghy that dismantle into a series of flat panels for easy stowage.

Inflatable tubes can be fitted to an existing hard dinghy, increasing buoyancy and stability.

Hardware and materials
A dinghy should have a strong ring on the bow. The ring secures the painter (the line that anchors the boat to a dock), and is used for towing and anchoring. Ideally, the dinghy should also have two other rings (one on each side of the stern transom) which, with the bow ring, are used for lifting and securing the dinghy for stowage.

The only other essential pieces of hardware are rowlocks (also known as oarlocks). Conventionally, a dinghy will have an oar on each side. A single sculling oarlock or notch on the transom is less common, but requires less space; and is used with a single sculling oar moving back and forth, never leaving the water, as used on a sampan.

Many modern dinghies are made of synthetic materials. These require minimal care and do not rot but can suffer from fibre glass pox which is caused by the ingress of saltwater through the gel coat. Inflatable dinghies can be made of fabrics coated with Hypalon, neoprene or PVC. Rigid dinghies can be made of glass-fibre reinforced plastic (GRP) but injection-moulded one-piece hulls are also available.  Other materials for modern rigid dinghies include aluminium, marine plywood which tends to be much lighter than most types and, with the advent of sturdy, UV resistant polyurethane varnishes, wood. Some wooden dinghies (especially of classic or historical form) are built using the carvel or clinker methods. Favoured woods, in order of rot-resistance, are white oak, black locust, species of cedar and pine, true as well as African and Asian mahoganies, fir and spruce. Rot resistance depends on paint as well as protection from rainwater. Plastic hardware is sometimes used, but bronze and stainless steel are good corrosion-resistant materials for hardware, although stainless steel can be subject to crevice corrosion after many years especially in a boat using an outboard or other motor and must be inspected. Stainless steel should never be used for fittings permanently in the water. Owners should check that the correct grade of stainless steel is used in a fitting. Working boats may use lower-cost galvanized steel, but the hardware may need to be re-galvanized or replaced eventually.

The dinghy is generally carried inverted amidships on yachts, on top of the coachroof where there is the most space. It is useful for a dinghy carried this way to have handholds built into the bottom, making launching easier and providing handholds on deck.

Most yachts launch their dinghies by hand or with a simple lifting tackle rigged from the main mast. Davits over the transom is convenient and elegant, but sailing in a heavy following sea could cause the loss of a dinghy. If a dinghy is towed, an extra line with a loop in the end (known as a lazy painter) can be attached to a dinghy so that if the towing line breaks, there is a line to grab with a boat hook. This makes retrieval easier at sea, especially if the boat is partially swamped.

In some countries dinghies have names or registration numbers. On hard dinghies these are usually on the bow, on inflatables on the inside of the transom.

Propulsion

Oars

Small dinghies under  are usually powered by rowing with one set of oars. Beyond  it is feasible to have two or even three rowers, normally using a pair of oars. In some models, sliding thwarts allow far more powerful rowing while in others, a removable thwart can permit standing rowing. Some self-rescue dinghy/yacht tender dinghies have two sets of oarlocks (rowlocks) and an adjustable middle seat to allow for ergonomically efficient rowing positions. A single sculling oar with an oarlock on the rear transom can be a compact emergency oar. Inflatable dinghies without a rigid bottom are difficult to row more than a short distance, and are usually powered with an outboard motor, or, if necessary, paddled.

Motor

Another option is an outboard motor. Two horsepower per meter can reach hull speed.  will put a flat-bottomed dinghy on plane. The gas tank is usually placed under the rear thwart. Engines always swing up so the dinghy can be grounded without damage. Since the transom may need to be cut down for the engine to fit properly, an engine well should be used to prevent low waves from splashing over the transom and flooding the boat.

Sail

A typical sail choice for a dinghy is gunter rig with a shorter mast that fits within the hull when unstepped. Sprit rigs have no boom, and the advantage that the sail can be brailed up out of the way against the mast when rowing or motoring. Lug rigs are another common single sail type used in small dinghies, both standing and balanced (with some area forward of the mast), and usable with or without a boom.

Traditional working dinghies have a lee board that can be hooked over the side. This does not split the cargo space. A sailing rudder is usually tied or clipped to a simple pair of pintles (hinge pins) on the transom with the bottom pintle being longer so that the rudder can be mounted one pintle at a time. The rope keeps the rudder from floating off in a wave. Both rudders and lee boards have swiveling tips so the dinghy can be landed. Rudders are often arranged so the tiller folds against the rudder to make a compact package.

Racing dinghies usually have a daggerboard or centreboard to better sail upwind. The trunk is in the middle of what would otherwise be cargo area. A self-rescue dinghy intended to be used as a proactive lifeboat has leeboards on either side, to allow for maximum open cockpit area.

Solar

Solar propulsion uses hybrid flexible solar panels integrated into the bimini top supplying power to a lithium battery bank. Twin in-hull trolling motor produce  of thrust powering the solar dinghy to  depending on weather conditions. Alternate power is supplied by a propane outboard for increased speed and range.

Other equipment

Additional U.S. Coast Guard required and non-required items that should always be on a dinghy:
These are the U.S. Coast Guard's minimum requirements for recreational boats:

Personal flotation devices for every occupant
Bell, whistle
Visual distress signals
Fire extinguisher
Ventilation (boats built on or after 8/1/80)
Back-fire flame arrestor (gasoline engines installed after 25 April 1940)

These next items are not a Coast Guard requirement but should always be kept on board to maximize safety:

Oars
Bucket
First aid kit
Blanket
Rope

This equipment should be in a bag made of water-resistant materials.

Andersen-style self-bailers are also useful for engine-driven and sailing dinghies. These slot-shaped seacocks project into the stream below the hull and open when submerged and moving rapidly using the venturi effect. The downside of this solution is that if the boat is beached in sand, it can clog the self-bailers until the boat is inverted and the sand removed. These devices do not replace a hand-bailer as they are only useful if the vessel is moving.

A small anchor can be used to allow the crew of the dinghy to fish or rest. Dinghy anchors are usually either a mushroom shape, a small folding grapple hook or the more modern and efficient Danforth type, with floating rope that will avoid being cut by snags on the bottom. The mushroom is used in locations where the bottom is very muddy, while the grapple works better in rocks. Some persons prefer a small Danforth or plow, because of their superior holding power in all but rocks, but these have sharp edges, and need to be set with a little care. Even a dinghy should have a length of chain attached to the anchor - the same length as the dinghy. The warp then attaches to the short chain with a wired shackle. This gives added weight and help in setting an anchor. It also stops the warp fraying on sharp rocks when the dinghy swings to and fro with the tide. Generally an anchor warp should be 4 times the depth of the water. In strong winds this can be extended to 8 times the depth but most dinghies are not seaworthy enough to be anchored securely in such storm conditions.

A dinghy should not be able to scratch the mother-boat's paint; therefore a fender made from a length of heavy rope (or a strip of polyurethane) can be tied loosely to the outside of the bulwarks. This also provides a handhold for launching, or for people overboard to climb into the boat. Many modern dinghies have a molded ridge of plastic to replace the rope. A fitted acrylic canvas cover can shed seas or act as a shade or storage cover. Traditionally it toggles to the fender-rope or is suspended from the gunter (small folding mast) but can also be tied to a few points and secured with snaps or Velcro. Depending on the design there may be a large locker under a thwart.

See also

Boat building
Dinghy sailing
Dinghy racing
420 (dinghy)
Laser (dinghy)

Notes

References

Citations

Sources 
 Yule, Sir Henry, & Arthur Coke Burnell (1886) Hobson-Jobson: Being a Glossary of Anglo-Indian Colloquial Words and Phrases, and of Kindred Terms: Etymological, Historical, Geographical, and Discursive. (J. Murray).
 Smyth, Admiral William Henry. The Sailor's Word-Book. An Alphabetical Digest of Nautical Terms, including Some More Especially Military and Scientific, but Useful to Seamen; as well as Archaisms of Early Voyagers, etc. BLACKIE AND SON, London, 1867.

External links

 Directory of dinghy classes
 Dinghy classification by ISAF
 World of Boats (EISCA) Collection ~ Dutch Pram Dinghy
 National Maritime Museum Cornwall

 
Bengali words and phrases
Hindi words and phrases
Ship's boats